Deflagration to detonation transition (DDT) refers to a phenomenon in ignitable mixtures of a flammable gas and air (or oxygen) when a sudden transition takes place from a deflagration type of combustion to a detonation type of explosion.

Description
A deflagration is characterized by a subsonic flame propagation velocity, typically far below , and relatively modest overpressures, typically below . The main mechanism of combustion propagation is of a flame front that moves forward through the gas mixture - in technical terms the reaction zone (chemical combustion) progresses through the medium by processes of diffusion of heat and mass. In its most benign form, a deflagration may simply be a flash fire.

The main mechanism of detonation propagation is of a powerful pressure wave that compresses the unburnt gas ahead of the wave to a temperature above the autoignition temperature. In technical terms, the reaction zone (chemical combustion) is a self-driven shock wave where the reaction zone and the shock are coincident, and the chemical reaction is initiated by the compressive heating caused by the shock wave. The process is similar to ignition in a Diesel engine, but much more sudden and violent.

Under certain conditions, mainly in terms of geometrical conditions (such as partial confinement and many obstacles in the flame path that cause turbulent flame eddy currents), a subsonic flame front may accelerate to supersonic speed, transitioning from deflagration to detonation. The exact mechanism is not fully understood,
and while existing theories are able to explain and model both deflagrations and detonations, there is no theory at present which can predict the transition phenomenon.

Examples
A deflagration to detonation transition has been a feature of several major industrial accidents:
 1970 propane vapor cloud explosion in Port Hudson
 Flixborough disaster
 Phillips disaster of 1989 in Pasadena, Texas
 Damage observed in the Buncefield fire
 2020 Beirut explosions

Applications
The phenomenon is exploited in pulse detonation engines, because a detonation produces a more efficient combustion of the reactants than a deflagration does, i.e. giving a higher yields. Such engines typically employ a Shchelkin spiral in the combustion chamber to facilitate the deflagration to detonation transition.

The mechanism has also found military use in thermobaric weapons.

Related phenomena
An analogous deflagration to detonation transition (DDT) has also been proposed for thermonuclear reactions responsible for supernovae initiation. This process has been called a "carbon detonation".

See also
Zeldovich spontaneous wave
Dust explosion
Pressure piling
Boiling liquid expanding vapor explosion (BLEVE)

References

 

Combustion
Industrial fires and explosions
Explosives engineering